This article details the fixtures and results of the Azerbaijan national football team in 2000s.

2000–2009

2000

2001

2002

2003

2004

2005

2006

2007

2008

2009

References

2000